Nathaniel Alexander (1760 – 21 October 1840), was an Anglican bishop in Ireland during the first half of the 19th century.

He was born in 1760 and educated at Harrow and Emmanuel College, Cambridge. He was appointed Bishop of Clonfert and Kilmacduagh in 1802    and translated to Killaloe in 1804. Only six months later he became Bishop of Down and Connor. He was translated for a third time to Meath in 1823. A nephew of James Alexander, 1st Earl of Caledon; father of Robert Alexander, Archdeacon of Down from 1814 to 1828; and uncle of William Alexander, Archbishop of Armagh from 1896 to 1911, he died in post on 21 October 1840.

References

1760 births
People educated at Harrow School
Alumni of Emmanuel College, Cambridge
19th-century Anglican bishops in Ireland
Bishops of Clonfert and Kilmacduagh
Bishops of Killaloe and Kilfenora
Bishops of Down and Connor (Church of Ireland)
Anglican bishops of Meath
1840 deaths
Members of the Privy Council of Ireland
Nathaniel